Paronymus budonga is a butterfly in the family Hesperiidae. It is found in western Uganda and north-western Tanzania. The habitat consists of forests.

References

Butterflies described in 1938
Erionotini